Matelea cynanchoides, commonly called prairie milkvine, is a species of plant in the dogbane family that is native to south-central United States.

It is a perennial that produces yellow, maroon, or green flowers in the spring on non-twining vines.

References

Flora of North America
cynanchoides